James H. Klipfel Memorial Nature Sanctuary at Brockway Mountain, commonly referred to as Klipfel or Klipfel Memorial, is a  nature sanctuary located in Keweenaw County, Michigan. It is maintained and preserved by the Michigan Nature Association. The sanctuary is located near Copper Harbor on Brockway Mountain Drive. Brockway Mountain's alkaline bedrock outcrops, cliff faces, and many ledges create habitats for a variety of unusual plants, and spring hawk migrations can often be seen from the overlook at this sanctuary.

References 

Nature reserves in Michigan
Protected areas of Keweenaw County, Michigan